Scarab may refer to:

Beetles
Scarab (artifact), popular amulets and impression seals in Ancient Egypt
Scarabaeidae, the family of over 30,000 species of beetles, often called scarabs or scarab beetles
Scarabaeus sacer, common name Sacred scarab, sacred to ancient Egyptians

Arts, entertainment, and media
 Scarab (comics), a number of different comic book characters
 Scarab (video game), a 1997 first-person shooter
 Scarab, a fictional dinghy in Arthur Ransome's children's novel The Picts and the Martyrs
The Scarab Murder Case, a 1929 book
 "Scarab", a song by Northlane from Singularity, 2013
 "Scarabs", a song by Karnivool from Themata, 2005

Businesses and organisations
 Scarab (constructor), defunct all-American sports car and open-wheel race car constructor
 Scarab (fraternity), an architectural fraternity at University of Illinois
 Scarab, the former name of the video game company feelplus
Scarab Club, an artists' club, gallery, and studio in Detroit, Michigan, U.S.
Scarab Productions, a film, television and new media production company 
 Scarabbean Senior Society, an organization at the University of Tennessee whose members are called "scarabs"

Places
Scarab Bluff, Alexander Island, Antarctica
Scarab Peak, Victoria Land, Antarctica

Transportation

Aircraft
 RAE Scarab, a 1932 British light aircraft
 Teledyne Ryan Scarab, a jet-powered reconnaissance UAV developed in the United States in the 1980s for sale to Egypt
 Warner Scarab, an American seven-cylinder radial aircraft engine

Land vehicles and watercraft
 Scarab (boat), a brand of high performance power boats and fishing boats
 Scarab (rover), a 2010 robotic lunar rover prototype
 Scammell Scarab, a British 3-wheeled articulated lorry tractor unit produced 1948-1967
 Fiberfab Scarab STM (Sport Transport Module), an American 3-wheeled car
 Stout Scarab, a 1930–1940s American minivan
 Scarab compact road sweeper vehicle

Other uses
 Currency sign (typography) ¤ known as scarab
 Scarab SS-21, NATO term for the Russian OTR-21 Tochka tactical ballistic missile
 "Scarab", a disc golf putter by Infinite Discs

See also
Scarabaeus (video game)
WebScarab

Animal common name disambiguation pages